Klaus Fichtel (born 19 November 1944) is a German former professional footballer who played as a defender for Schalke 04 and Werder Bremen. He made 23 appearances for the West Germany national team.

Career
Fichtel was born in Castrop-Rauxel, Province of Westphalia He began his career with FC Schalke 04 and after four years with SV Werder Bremen he returned to Schalke. In total he played 552 games (14 goals) in the Bundesliga. In addition, he played 42 times in the 2. Bundesliga in one of his four years with SV Werder Bremen. 

Fichtel is the oldest player to appear in the Bundesliga, playing his last match at the age of 43 and a half years in May 1988. His 477 Bundesliga matches for Schalke 04 remain a club record.

Fichtel won 23 caps in four years with West Germany in between 1967 and 1971, scoring one goal against Scotland in 1969. He was part of the West German squad at the 1970 FIFA World Cup, playing in five matches during the tournament.

Career statistics

References

External links
 
 
 

Living people
1944 births
People from Castrop-Rauxel
Sportspeople from Münster (region)
People from the Province of Westphalia
Association football central defenders
German footballers
Bundesliga players
2. Bundesliga players
FC Schalke 04 players
SV Werder Bremen players
Germany international footballers
1970 FIFA World Cup players
Footballers from North Rhine-Westphalia
West German footballers